Abisheganaden is a surname. Notable people with the surname include:

Jacintha Abisheganaden (born 1957), Singaporean singer, actress, and theater practitioner
Paul Abisheganaden (1914–2011), Singaporean conductor